Bardet–Biedl syndrome 2 protein is a protein that in humans is encoded by the BBS2 gene.

This gene encodes a protein of unknown function. Mutations in this gene have been observed in patients with Bardet–Biedl syndrome type 2. Bardet–Biedl syndrome is an autosomal recessive disorder characterized by severe pigmentary retinopathy, obesity, polydactyly, renal malformation, and mental retardation.

References

External links
  GeneReviews/NIH/NCBI/UW entry on Bardet-Biedl Syndrome

Further reading